"7" is a song by American musician Prince and the New Power Generation, from their 1992 Love Symbol Album. It was released in late 1992 as the third single from the album, and became the most successful in the United States. It features a sample of the 1967 Lowell Fulsom song "Tramp" and is composed of heavy drums and bass in an acoustic style. It has a distinct Middle Eastern style of music, and a Hindu reincarnation theme, and an opera-like chorus which features Prince's multi-tracked vocals. The lyrics have religious and apocalyptic themes. The song is ambiguous and can be interpreted in many ways, as the "7" mentioned in the chorus could be the song referring to the Seven Deadly Sins or the seven Archon of Gnosticism or the seven names of God in the Old Testament. The song received positive reviews and peaked within the top forty of many of its major markets.

Chart performance 
In the United States, "7" was most successful on the Top 40 Pop/Mainstream chart, where it peaked at  3 and reached No. 7 on the Billboard Hot 100. It performed respectably on the Rhythmic charts (No. 19). However, it was less popular with R&B/Hip Hop radio, stalling at No. 61. On the Canadian RPM chart the song peaked at No. 12. The single reached No. 27 in the UK, falling short of the success of the previous two releases, "Sexy MF" and "My Name is Prince", which had become top 10 hits.

Critical reception 
Upon the release, Larry Flick from Billboard wrote, "You can never be too sure of what this Paisley dude will serve up next. This time, he concocts a stew of old and new flavors: retro-funk shuffle beats are countered by hip-hop-style scratching and topped with flower-child strumming and sitars. The hook is rousing and immediate, and should find a welcome home at several levels lickety-split." Randy Clark from Cashbox stated, "This new single is an apocalyptic musical revelation done in the "Give Peace a Chance" mode, except the elaborate vocal arrangements have the well disciplined guidance of the funk-meister." In his weekly UK chart commentary, James Masterton opined that, "with the Christmas competition this is unlilkely to become another massive hit for Prince." Richard Harrington from The Washington Post felt "the visionary "7", which has a genial psychedelic-folk-rockish '60s sound and spirit, could have fit comfortably on Around the World in a Day."

Retrospective response 
In an 2017 retrospective review, Andy Healy from Albumism named the song a "standout" from the album, noting its "glorious, eastern inspired mystical magic" with "the multitude of layered vocals and hypnotic groove." He added, "Not to mention the cryptic lyrics—is he singing about the seven deadly sins, the seven seals of Revelations, the seven major religions or the seven major record labels." Alexis Petridis from The Guardian ranked "7" number 34 in his list of "Prince's 50 Greatest Singles – Ranked!" in 2019. He wrote, "If you want evidence of Prince's unique, almost mystical, abilities, "7" is an intriguing place to start." He added, "At heart, the song is a rousing acoustic campfire singalong with lyrics of a spiritual bent, albeit a fairly baffling one. Deeply unpromising on paper, he somehow makes it work to striking effect, spooning on the harmonies and vintage sitar effects." In 2020, Rolling Stone noted that the singer "expanded his sonic palette" on the song, "tapping into tablas and sitars, widescreen multi-tracked vocals and a sample of Lowell Fulson's "Tramp"." The magazine noted further, "Of course, given his out-there status at the time, Prince may have also been dabbling in numerology". 

Slant Magazine ranked "7" number 66 on their list of "The 100 Best Singles of the 1990s" in 2011, writing, "A Bible verse as related by a New World prince, "7" is a lush allegory for the perils of romantic strife, set across deserts and streets of gold and featuring armies, plagues, and angels. Among the fiercest tracks from Prince and the New Power Generation’s Love Symbol Album, this rock soap opera is a predictable cock-storm of funk, the One and Only’s vulnerable, emotion-rich falsetto wielding the same blunt-force trauma as the swords and tambourines that are dropped into the production with the sort of timing that would be corny if it weren’t so swoony. Way before he takes it to church, Prince’s intellect and savoir-faire has saved the day."

Music video 
The accompanying music video for the song was shot on February 27, 1992. It is directed by Sotera Tschetter and begins with Mayte whispering "imagine" in Prince's ear, in the position they are in on the single cover. A scene from 3 Chains o' Gold is shown as well. It features Mayte belly-dancing. The video set is pictured on the Love Symbol album cover, along with a still shot from the video. In the video, Prince symbolically "kills" incarnations of himself who are trapped inside glass chambers. There are little girls wearing yellow belly-dancing outfits almost identical to Mayte's and  little boys wearing black outfits and eyebands identical to Prince's. Throughout the performance, the girls dance with Mayte and the boys dance with Prince. 

The video is also notable for Mayte dancing with a sword on her head, which she would later do in live performances; the video featured her playing the role she played in 3 Chains o' Gold as an Egyptian princess who befriends Prince and enlists his help to find the men who assassinated her father.  Mayte kisses and releases a Eurasian Collared Dove during her performance. The video was nominated for an MTV Video Music Award for Best R&B Video, but lost to "Free Your Mind" by En Vogue. It was later published on YouTube in October 2017, and had generated more than 3.2 million views as of September 2021.

Track listings 
 7-inch and CD single
 "7" (LP version) – 5:13
 "7" (acoustic version) – 3:54

 12-inch single
 "7" (LP version) – 5:13
 "7" (acoustic version) – 3:54
 "7" (After 6 Long Version) – 5:15

 12-inch and CD maxi-single
 "7" (LP version) – 5:13
 "7" (After 6 Edit) – 4:20
 "7" (After 6 Long Version) – 5:15
 "7" (acoustic version) – 3:54
 "7" (album edit) – 4:23
 "2 Whom It May Concern" – 4:01

Charts and certifications

Weekly charts

Year-end charts

Certifications

Release history

References 

Prince (musician) songs
1992 singles
1992 songs
Paisley Park Records singles
Seven deadly sins in popular culture
Song recordings produced by Prince (musician)
Songs written by Prince (musician)
Warner Records singles